The  or Sagano Sightseeing Railway is a wholly owned subsidiary of West Japan Railway Company (JR West) that operates the , Sagano Sight-seeing Line, or  in Kyoto.

It is closed on Wednesdays and in the winter.

The line is locally known as "Torokko in Hozu gorge". Torokko is a Japanese word derived from the English "truck" once used for mining cars hauling ore, but presently means rail carriages basic accommodation and open sides.

Description

Company
Wholly owned subsidiary of West Japan Railway Company
Headquarters: Ukyō-ku, Kyoto, Kyoto Prefecture, Japan
Founded: 1990
Major enterprise: Operation of Sagano Scenic Line

Line
Under Railway Business Act (not under Tram Act)
Operation and possession (see Three categories of railway)
Operation: Sagano Scenic Railway (category 2)
Possession: West Japan Railway (category 1)
Track: single
Shares down (for Kameoka) track of Sanin Main Line between Torokko Saga and Torokko Arashiyama stations. Up trains of the line traverse the down line to reach Arashiyama.
Traction: internal combustion (diesel)
No. of stations: 4 including both ends
Rolling stock
Locomotive: 1
Coaches: 5

History

Construction of the line
The line was originally a part of the main line of the  opened in 1899, to connect Kyoto to the northern part of Kyoto Prefecture, or the old province of Tanba. The company adopted the relatively level route through the gorge, avoiding  pass which would have required a steep grade. The company was nationalized in 1907. The line became a part of the San'in Main Line.

Bypass

Success
JR West utilised the original line for tourism under a subsidiary founded in 1990. JR West used old rolling stock for this purpose; four semi-open coaches hauled by a diesel locomotive.

By 1991, the line was more popular than expected (there had been speculation that the venture would be unsuccessful). As a result, a fifth carriage, nicknamed , was introduced. The car is contrary to its name, converted from an old gondola of JR West to fully open carriage, even the floor and the sides are of fine grills and offers a rough ride.

Combined with rafting on the Hozu River, it is a major tourist attraction in Arashiyama and Sagano.

Operation
All trains are operated between Torokko Saga and Torokko Kameoka stations. All seats are reserved, and tickets (JPY 620 for adult and JPY 310 for child, as of 2019) are on sale one month prior to the operation with some exceptions. Some are sold on the day, but travel in "The Rich" is not available on rainy days. Down (for Kameoka) trains cater for a return journey via the Hozu River boat ride to Arashiyama, thus up trains are generally less patronised.

Stations

Except Torokko Kameoka is in Kameoka, all stations are in Kyoto.
 (トロッコ嵯峨)
Newly built next to the Saga Station of the San'in Main Line as the terminus of Kyoto
 (トロッコ嵐山)
Newly built next to the eastern portal of a tunnel entering to the gorge.
 (トロッコ保津峡)
Continued to use the old station on the abandoned line after slight refurbishment.
 (トロッコ亀岡)
Newly built on the abandoned line as the terminus of Kameoka

Rolling stock
As mentioned above, all are JR West origin. Daily and minor maintenance is carried out at Torokko Saga, while heavy maintenances in JR West facility.

Liveried in red, yellow and black, explained as a typical colour set to infer Kyoto.

Locomotive
JNR Class DE10 diesel locomotive, No. DE10 1104
Heading on Saga end of the formation
Passenger cars, from Saga side to Kameoka
SK300-1, SK100-1, SK100-11, SK100-2, SK200-1
All were converted from Toki 25000 type gondolas (trucks)
SK200-1 is equipped with controller on the Kameoka end
SK300-1 is nicknamed "The Rich", floor and side are of fine grills

See also
 List of railway lines in Japan

References
This article incorporates material from the corresponding article in the Japanese Wikipedia.

Ministry of Land, Infrastructure and Transport (2001) , Tokyo:

External links

English Official Website

Railway companies of Japan
Railway lines in Japan
Rail transport in Kyoto Prefecture
West Japan Railway Company
Tourist attractions in Kyoto
Railway lines opened in 1899
1067 mm gauge railways in Japan
1899 establishments in Japan
Heritage railways in Japan